Orpecacantha aphrodite is a moth of the family Autostichidae. It is found on Cyprus.

The wingspan is 11–12 mm. The forewings are chalk-white with a blackish brown pattern. The hindwings are whitish grey.

References

Moths described in 1986
Orpecacantha